From the Mouth of the Whale is a 2008 novel by the Icelandic writer Sjón. The English translation was shortlisted for the 2012 Independent Foreign Fiction Prize. and the 2013 International Dublin Literary Award.

See also
 2008 in literature
 Icelandic literature

References

2008 novels
Icelandic novels
Novels set in Iceland
Novels set in the Reformation
Icelandic-language novels